Aurotalis nigrisquamalis is a moth in the family Crambidae. It was described by George Hampson in 1919. It is found in Lesotho, South Africa and Zimbabwe.

References

Crambinae
Moths described in 1919
Moths of Africa
Taxa named by George Hampson